Arak Oil Refinery or Arak Oil Refining Company is an Iranian oil refining and petrochemical company which is located at 20 km from Arak, in Markazi Province. Arak petrochemical company is located at next to Arak oil refinery.

Production 
The production estimated 170,000 barrels/day in 2013, it announced by NIORDC in 2020 as 250,000 barrels per day.

References 

Oil refineries in Iran
Coordinates not on Wikidata

Companies based in Arak